The 1979 Copa Polla Gol Final was played between Universidad de Chile and Colo-Colo at the Estadio Nacional in Santiago, Chile on April 14, 1979, to determine that year's competition winner. Universidad de Chile won the match 2-1, lifting the cup for the first time in its history.

Match details

Copa Chile finals
1979 in Chilean football
Colo-Colo matches
Club Universidad de Chile matches